Ievoli Sun was a chemical tanker chartered by Napolitan ship-owner Domenico Ievoli.

History
The wreckage was caused by bad weather, and water intake at the bow, which filled the forward storage area and the bow thruster bay. The increase in weight caused a negative pitch, which worsened while more compartments filled.

A distress call was received by the CROSS at 04:30. At 07:17, a Super Frelon of the French Navy departed to evacuate the 14-man crew of the tanker, amid  winds. An hour later, the helicopter arrived on the scene, and evacuated the crew in 40 minutes. The tugboat  arrived and started tugging the tanker at  toward Normandy.

The next day in the morning, Ievoli Sun sank. Only small traces of chemicals were noticed.

References

External links 

 Total Loss of the Italian Chemical Tanker Ievoli Sun in the English Channel - 30 October 2000 - Bureau d'Enquêtes sur les Événements de Mer (Archive)
  Perte totale du navire Chimiquier italien IEVOLI SUN (Archive) and annexes (Archive, Alt). - Bureau d'Enquêtes sur les Événements de Mer
  Naufrage du Ievoli Sun on polmar.com

Chemical tankers
Tankers of Italy
2000 industrial disasters
Maritime incidents in 2000
1989 ships